Utricularia scandens is a small, probably annual carnivorous plant that belongs to the genus Utricularia. It has a wide native distribution that includes Africa (Angola, Cameroon, the Central African Republic, Côte d'Ivoire, the Democratic Republic of the Congo, Ethiopia, Guinea, Madagascar, Malawi, Mozambique, Nigeria, South Africa, Sudan, Tanzania, Zambia, and Zimbabwe) and Asia (Bangladesh, Burma, China, India, Indonesia, Malaysia, Nepal, Sri Lanka, Thailand, and Vietnam). It was originally described by Ludwig Benjamin in 1847. There is a significant amount of synonymy established for this species, in part because of its large distribution and variable morphology.

Synonyms 
Polypompholyx madecassa H.Perrier
Utricularia bifida var. wallichiana (Wight) Thwaites
U. gibbsiae Stapf
U. macrolepis Wight
[U. micropetala Hutch. & Dalziel]
[U. prehensilis Pellegr.]
U. scandens subsp. scandens P.Taylor
U. scandens var. scandens P.Taylor
U. scandens subsp. schweinfurthii (Baker ex Stapf) P.Taylor
U. schweinfurthii Baker ex Stapf
U. wallichiana Wight
U. wallichii Wight
U. volubilis Wight

See also 
 List of Utricularia species

References 

scandens
Carnivorous plants of Africa
Carnivorous plants of Asia
Flora of Cameroon
Flora of China
Flora of Ivory Coast
Flora of Ethiopia
Flora of Guinea
Flora of Madagascar
Flora of Nigeria
Flora of South Africa
Flora of South Tropical Africa
Flora of Sudan
Flora of Tanzania
Flora of tropical Asia
Flora of the Central African Republic
Flora of the Democratic Republic of the Congo